Bittersweet Fools is a visual novel eroge developed by Minori. It was ported to the Dreamcast and PlayStation 2 with H-content removed as part of the Simple series line of "ren'ai adventure" games. It is vol.1 on the Dreamcast and vol.9 on the PS2.

The anime opening of the game was directed by Makoto Shinkai. The game takes place in Florence, Italy. The character design is by Yu Aida, whose Gunslinger Girl series also takes place in Italy.

Characters
  The protagonist. A former mafia assassin.
 
 Voiced by: Miwa Kōduki
 Voiced by: Ruri Asano
 
 
 
  A flower shop girl that works near the apartment that Alan lives in.
  His name is a pseudonym taken from the Italian city of Palermo.Voiced by: Kenji Hamada
  His name is a pseudonym derived from the Italian pasta eliche.Voiced by: Keiji Okuda
 
 
  A mysterious man.

External links
Official page for the PC version
Official page for the PS2 version
Official page for the Dreamcast version

2001 video games
Bishōjo games
D3 Publisher games
Dreamcast games
Eroge
HuneX games
Japan-exclusive video games
PlayStation 2 games
Simple 2000 games
Single-player video games
Video games developed in Japan
Visual novels
Windows games
Minori (company) games